The Ministry of Public Works and Transport is one of the government ministries of Lebanon. The incumbent minister is Michael Najjar.

Directorates 
The Ministry is organised into four Directorates:

Directorate General of Land and Maritime Transport, responsible for setting, implementing and monitoring all policies related to land and maritime transport
Directorate General of Roads and Buildings, which is responsible for the construction, rehabilitation, and maintenance of public roads and government buildings
Directorate General of Civil Aviation, responsible for setting and implementing air transport policies within the country in compliance with international policies, and for controlling the air traffic within the Lebanese territory
Directorate General of Urban Planning, responsible for setting and putting into practice land use policies

Ministers 

 Michel Najjar, 21 January 2020 – 10 August 2020

See also 

Lebanese Ministry of Defense

References 

Public Works and Transport
Lebanon
Lebanon
Transport organisations based in Lebanon